The County of Bentinck is a county located on the southern boundary of the state of Queensland, Australia. Like all counties in Queensland, it is a non-functional administrative unit, that is used mainly for the purpose of registering land titles.  The county was named in 1838 after William Cavendish-Bentinck, 3rd Duke of Portland, who served as Prime Minister of Great Britain twice, in 1783 and again between 1807 and 1809.  Population centres within the County of Bentinck include the towns of Stanthorpe, Wallangarra, Glen Aplin, Applethorpe and Inglewood.

Parishes

See also
 Cadastral divisions of Queensland

References

External links 

 

Bentinck